Formula Renault 2.0 Alps was a category of Formula Renault open-wheel racing, created by the merging of the Formula Renault 2.0 Middle European Championship (formerly known as Formula Renault 2.0 Switzerland) and Formula Renault 2.0 Italia.

Overview
With circuit racing forbidden in Switzerland, the championship is held in bordering countries like France (Dijon, Magny-Cours, Pau), Germany (Hockenheim), Italy (Imola, Monza, Mugello, Misano) and Austria (Salzburg, Red Bull Ring). However, in recent years the championship has visited farther countries like Belgium (Spa-Francorchamps) and Spain (Jerez, Barcelona).

Circuits of Formula Renault 2.0 Alps 

  Circuit de Barcelona-Catalunya (2012)
  Circuit de Pau-Ville (2011–2012, 2014–2015)
  Circuit de Spa-Francorchamps (2011–2015)
  Circuit Paul Ricard (2011)
  Circuito de Jerez (2014–2015)
  Hungaroring (2011)
  Imola Circuit (2011–2015)
  Misano World Circuit Marco Simoncelli (2013, 2015)
  Monza Circuit (2011–2015)
  Mugello Circuit (2012–2014)
  Red Bull Ring (2011–2012, 2014–2015)
  Vallelunga Circuit (2013)

The cars use Tatuus chassis and the 2.0 L Renault Clio engines like other Formula Renault 2.0 series. Michelin is the tyres supplier.

Current point system
Points are awarded as following :

In each race, one bonus point are given for pole position and one point for fastest lap. Only classified drivers are awarded points for finish position.

Champions

Formula Renault 2.0 Switzerland/Middle Europe

Formula Renault 2.0 Alps

References

External links
 Renault Sport Italia
 Renault Sport Suisse

Alps
Recurring sporting events established in 2002
Recurring sporting events disestablished in 2015